This is a list of seasons completed by the Southern Miss Golden Eagles college football team.

Future Non-Conference Games 
In addition to its usual conference games, Southern Miss is scheduled to play the following teams: (The opponent's current conference is in parenthesis)

All dates are tentative and subject to change.

References

Southern Miss Golden Eagles
Southern Miss Golden Eagles football seasons